An ecosection is a biogeographic unit smaller than an ecoregion that contains minor physiographic, macroclimatic or oceanographic variations. They are a virtual ecological zone in the Canadian province of British Columbia, which contains 139 ecosections that vary from pure terrestrial units to pure marine units.

See also
Bioregion
Ecological classification

References

Biogeography
Ecology terminology